Wake Up Living is the second album by Canadian singer Kalan Porter, the 2004 winner of Canadian Idol. The album was produced and mixed by Brian Malouf. It was released August 28, 2007 on Sony BMG.

Background
In contrast to his first album, 219 Days, he describes this second effort as being more reflective of what he would like to do musically, and he co-wrote most of this album's songs. The lead single, "Down in Heaven", is a tribute to his mother's battle with breast cancer. The second single is "Destination (Where I Belong)", and its video premiered on MuchMusic in November 2007. A music video for the third single, "Hurray", was released in spring 2008.

Track listing 
 "Down in Heaven" (Kalan Porter, Chris Farren, Ashley Gorley)
 "Destination (Where I Belong)" (Porter, Luke McMaster, Rob Wells)
 "Hurray" (Porter, Stevie Salas, Greg Johnston)
 "Run Run Run" (Sascha Skarbek, Alex Reid)
 "Try" (Porter, Dave Thompson, Dave Martin)
 "One Last Try" (Hiten Bahradia, Jamie Hartman)
 "Beauty" (David Mead)
 "Karma King" (Porter, Peter Zizzo)
 "Wrong" (Wells, Matt Marston, Anders Kallmark)
 "Walk On Home" (Porter, Mark Makoway, Jeff Pearce)
 "Out of My Head" (Porter, Parthenon Huxley, Stevie Salas)

Singles
"Down in Heaven"
"Destination (Where I Belong)"
"Hurray"

Personnel 
 Kalan Porter – vocals, violin, strings
 Julian Coryell – electric and acoustic guitars
 David Levita – electric and acoustic guitars
 Dave Palmer – grand piano, synthesizers
 Curt Schneider – bass
 Aaron Sterling – drums
 George Stanford – rhythm and acoustic guitar overdubs, keyboards, percussion, background vocals
 Brian Malouf – loops, percussion, pads
 Marshall Altman – background vocals

References 

Kalan Porter albums
2007 albums